Aachen II is an electoral constituency (German: Wahlkreis) represented in the Bundestag. It elects one member via first-past-the-post voting. Under the current constituency numbering system, it is designated as constituency 88. It is located in western North Rhine-Westphalia, comprising the area of Städteregion Aachen outside the city of Aachen.

Aachen II was created for the inaugural 1949 federal election. Since 2017, it has been represented by Claudia Moll of the Social Democratic Party (SPD).

Geography
Aachen II is located in western North Rhine-Westphalia. As of the 2021 federal election, it comprises the Städteregion Aachen excluding the city of Aachen.

History
Aachen II was created in 1949, then known as Aachen-Land. From 1980 through 2009, it was named Kreis Aachen. It acquired its current name in the 2013 election. In the 1949 election, it was North Rhine-Westphalia constituency 2 in the numbering system. In the 1953 through 1961 elections, it was number 61. From 1965 through 1998, it was number 54. From 2002 through 2009, it was number 89. Since the 2013 election, it has been number 88.

Originally, the constituency was coterminous with the Landkreis Aachen district. In the 1965 and 1969 elections, it also contained the Monschau district. In the 1972 through 2009 elections, it was coterminous with Kreis Aachen district. Though its borders have not changed since 1972, the former district of Kreis Aachen was incorporated into the Städteregion Aachen in 2009.

Members
The constituency was first represented by Franz Mühlenberg of the Christian Democratic Union (CDU) from 1949 to 1961, followed by fellow CDU member Josef Müller until 1972. The constituency was won by the Social Democratic Party (SPD) candidate Kurt Koblitz in 1972, who served until 1980. Erich Berschkeit of the SPD then served a single term from 1980 to 1983. Hans Peter Schmitz regained the constituency for the CDU in 1983, but the SPD won again in 1987 with Achim Großmann. He served until 2009, when Helmut Brandt of the CDU was elected. Claudia Moll of the SPD was elected in 2017 and re-elected in 2021.

Election results

2021 election

2017 election

2013 election

2009 election

References

Federal electoral districts in North Rhine-Westphalia
Aachen (district)
1949 establishments in West Germany
Constituencies established in 1949